Foss Shanahan  (10 June 1910 – 13 September 1964) was a New Zealand diplomat and public servant.

Biography
Shanahan was born on 10 June 1910 at Alexandra. He was educated at the Christian Brothers' Boys' School in Dunedin and Waitaki Boys' High School, passing the public service entrance examination in 1926. He joined the public service in 1928 and studied part-time at the University of Otago and Victoria University of Wellington, graduating from Victoria with a Master of Laws (LLM) in 1936.

He started in the Customs Department, then in 1939 joined the Prime Minister’s Department, in the section that became the New Zealand Ministry of Foreign Affairs and Trade. He was Assistant Secretary of the War Cabinet 1940-45, Deputy Secretary of the External Affairs Department 1943-55, Secretary of Cabinet 1946-55, and Head of Defence Secretariat 1949-55. He set up the Cabinet Secretariat, and was known as "Foss the Boss."

He served as Commissioner then High Commissioner to Singapore (also to Malaya and Ambassador to Thailand) 1955-58, then as High Commissioner to Canada 1958-61 and Permanent Representative to the United Nations in New York 1958-62. In the 1962 Queen's Birthday Honours, Shanahan was appointed a Companion of the Order of St Michael and St George.

He died (of a brain tumour) on 13 September 1964 in Wellington.

Personal life
He married Joan Katherine McCormick  (or Joan Mason) on 18 April 1938; they had four sons and one daughter.

External links
 1961 letter to Salient "The Challenge of Change" by Foss Shanahan

References

Unofficial Channels: Letters between Alister McIntosh and Foss Shanahan, George Laking and Frank Corner 1946-1966 edited by Ian McGibbon (1999, Victoria University Press, Wellington NZ)  
Undiplomatic Dialogue: Letters between Carl Berendsen and Alister McIntosh 1943-1952 edited by Ian McGibbon (1993, Auckland University Press, Auckland NZ) 

1910 births
1964 deaths
High Commissioners of New Zealand to Canada
Deaths from cancer in New Zealand
Deaths from brain tumor
People educated at Trinity Catholic College, Dunedin
People educated at Waitaki Boys' High School
New Zealand public servants
People from Alexandra, New Zealand
Permanent Representatives of New Zealand to the United Nations
Victoria University of Wellington alumni
High Commissioners of New Zealand to Singapore
Ambassadors of New Zealand to Thailand
High Commissioners of New Zealand to Malaysia
New Zealand Companions of the Order of St Michael and St George